Nehmitzsee is a lake in Landkreis Oberhavel, Brandenburg, Germany. At an elevation of 60.0 m, its surface area is 1.71 km².

External links 
 

Lakes of Brandenburg
Oberhavel